CAT4 or Cat 4 may refer to:

 Cognitive Abilities Test (CAT4) used to predict student success by assessing verbal, non-verbal, mathematical, and spatial reasoning.  
 Category 4 cable, network cabling that consists of four unshielded twisted-pair wires
 Qualicum Beach Airport (ICAO code), an airport in British Columbia, Canada
 Category 4 hurricane
  LTE User Equipment Category 4 in mobile communications standards